Acetitomaculum is a genus in the phylum Bacillota (Bacteria). The single species is an acetogenic bacteria from the bovine rumen.

History
The genus Acetitomaculum was originally created to describe strains of bacteria isolated from a mature Hereford crossbred steer fed a typical high forage diet. They were isolated in a screen for acetate-producing bacteria extracted from the steer rumen.

Etymology
The name of the genus is derived from the Latin noun acetum, meaning vinegar, combined with the Latin noun tomaculum, a kind of sausage. Together they form Acetitomaculum, literally a kind of vinegar sausage. The name of the type species, A. ruminis is derived from the Latin genitive noun ruminis, meaning "of the rumen".

Characteristics
Members of Acetitomaculum are Gram-positive rods which can utilize formate, glucose, and carbon monoxide.

The genus contains a single species, A. ruminis, which is the type species of the genus.

See also
 Bacterial taxonomy
 Microbiology

References 

Bacteria genera
Lachnospiraceae
Monotypic bacteria genera